The 2011 New England Revolution season was the sixteenth season of the team's existence, all in Major League Soccer. The regular season began on March 20, 2011 at Los Angeles Galaxy and concluded on October 22, 2011 at Toronto FC. New England's first league home game was March 26 against D.C. United.

Overview

Preseason

February
The New England Revolution started training camp in Foxboro at Gillette Stadium on Monday January 31, 2011. After two weeks of training in New England, the Revolution move camp down to Florida to begin playing games and getting ready for the 2011 MLS Season.

Regular season

March
The New England Revolution opened up the 2011 MLS Season on the road with a 1–1 tie against the Los Angeles Galaxy at the Home Depot Center in Carson, California on March 20. The game was played in a heavy rainstorm with difficult field conditions. Shalrie Joseph scored the first goal of the year for the club in the 3rd minute of the game to give them the early 1-0 lead, but the score was later leveled on a Juninho strike from long distance. The Revolution made their 2011 home opener at Gillette Stadium on March 26 against the D.C. United. Two early goals in that game by Zack Schilawski and Joseph gave the Revolution a 2–0 lead which they held on to until stoppage time in the second half where Charlie Davies scored on a penalty. The Revolution held on to win the game 2-1, improving their win streak in home openers to 5 games.

Squad

Current roster

Squad information

Player movement

Transfers

In

Out

Loans

Out

Statistics

Starting XI
[]

Tactic Order: 4-2-1-2-1

Top scorers 
Includes all competitive matches. The list is sorted by competition level when total goals are equal.

{| class="wikitable" style="font-size: 95%; text-align: center;"
|-
!width=60|Rank
!width=60|Nation
!width=60|Number
!width=150|Name
!width=80|MLS
!width=80|U.S. Open Cup
!width=80|Atlanta Pro Soccer Challenge
!width=80|Total
|-
|1
|
|21
|Shalrie Joseph
|5
|0
|0
|5
|-
|2
|
|11
|Kheli Dube
|0
|2
|0
|2
|-
|3
|
|15
|Zack Schilawski
|1
|0
|0
|1
|-
|3
|
|26
|Stephen McCarthy
|1
|0
|0
|1
|-
|3
|
|9
|Ilija Stolica
|1
|0
|0
|1
|-
|3
|
|29
|Marko Perovic
|1
|0
|0
|1
|-
|3
|
|10
|Rajko Lekic
|3
|0
|0
|3
|-
|3
|
|12
|Alan Koger
|0
|1
|0
|1

Top assists

{| class="wikitable" style="font-size: 95%; text-align: center;"
|-
!width=60|Rank
!width=60|Nation
!width=60|Number
!width=150|Name
!width=80|MLS
!width=80|Open Cup
!width=80|Atlanta Pro Soccer Challenge
!width=80|Total
|-
|1
|
|7
|Kenny Mansally
|1
|1
|0
|2
|-
|2
|
|29
|Marko Perovic
|1
|0
|0
|1
|-
|2
|
|22
|Benny Feilhaber
|1
|0
|0
|1
|-
|2
|
|21
|Shalrie Joseph
|1
|0
|0
|1
|-
|2
|
|15
|Zack Schilawski
|1
|0
|0
|1
|-
|2
|
|33
|Zak Boggs
|1
|0
|0
|1
|-
|2
|
|28
|Pat Phelan
|1
|0
|0
|1
|-
|2
|
|12
|Alan Koger
|0
|1
|0
|1
|-

Disciplinary 
Includes all competitive matches. Players with 1 card or more included only.

Club staff

Competitions

Overall

Standings

Results summary

Results by rounds

Match results

Preseason

Major League Soccer 

Kickoff times are in EST.

U.S. Open Cup

World Football Challenge

Recognition

Miscellany

Allocation ranking 
New England is in the #16 position in the MLS Allocation Ranking. The allocation ranking is the mechanism used to determine which MLS club has first priority to acquire a U.S. National Team player who signs with MLS after playing abroad, or a former MLS player who returns to the league after having gone to a club abroad for a transfer fee. New England started 2011 ranked #6 on the allocation list and used its ranking to acquire Benny Feilhaber. A ranking can be traded, provided that part of the compensation received in return is another club's ranking.

International roster spots 
New England has 8 international roster spots. Each club in Major League Soccer is allocated 8 international roster spots, which can be traded. There have been no New England trades involving international spots for the 2011 season. There is no limit on the number of international slots on each club's roster. The remaining roster slots must belong to domestic players. For clubs based in the United States, a domestic player is either a U.S. citizen, a permanent resident (green card holder) or the holder of other special status (e.g., refugee or asylum status).

Future draft pick trades 
Future picks acquired: 2013 MLS SuperDraft Round 2 pick acquired from D.C. United.
Future picks traded: None.

References

New England Revolution seasons
New England Revolution
New England Revolution
New England Revolution
Sports competitions in Foxborough, Massachusetts